London Underground K Stock is a clerestory-roofed rail stock built for the District line in 1927. It was subsequently absorbed into the London Underground Q Stock.

A complete review of District line rolling stock was carried out in 1926, leading to the withdrawal of further B Stock cars and their replacement, plus additional rolling stock to increase frequencies. This led to the construction of the K Stock, some of which was owned by the London, Midland and Scottish Railway (LMS).

As built, the cars had hand-operated sliding doors. The doors were converted to air operation in 1938 as part of the Q Stock project. The modified cars were reclassified as Q27 stock. The last of the Q Stock was withdrawn in 1971.

Metropolitan District Railway
K
Train-related introductions in 1927